Autumnimiris is a genus of plant bugs in the family Miridae. There are about six described species in Autumnimiris.

Species
These six species belong to the genus Autumnimiris:
 Autumnimiris albescens (Van Duzee, 1925)
 Autumnimiris guadalupe Schwartz, 1989
 Autumnimiris koebelei (Van Duzee, 1921)
 Autumnimiris koebeli (Van Duzee, 1921)
 Autumnimiris roseus (Distant, 1883)
 Autumnimiris rubicundus (Uhler, 1872)

References

Further reading

 
 
 
 

Miridae genera
Articles created by Qbugbot
Stenodemini